Isaac Mills (5 April 1869 – 16 August 1956) was a New Zealand cricketer who played first-class cricket for Auckland between 1890 and 1903.

Mills's family migrated from England to New Zealand in 1873, sailing on the Berar. A opening batsman, Ike Mills was one of Auckland's leading players in the 1890s. His brothers Edward and George also played for Auckland.

Mills top-scored for Auckland in three consecutive matches in the 1893-94 season. In the second match, against Otago, he carried his bat for 88 not out in a team total of 156. He played in New Zealand's first representative match later that season, against the touring Queensland team. He top-scored in each innings when Auckland played the touring Australians in November 1896, scoring 20 and 28, and was selected to play for New Zealand later that month, but he was unsuccessful in that match. He toured Australia in 1898-99 in New Zealand's first overseas touring team, scoring 31 and 19 in the match against Victoria.

See also
 List of Auckland representative cricketers

References

External links
 

1869 births
1956 deaths
New Zealand cricketers
Pre-1930 New Zealand representative cricketers
Auckland cricketers
People from Medway
Sportspeople from Kent
North Island cricketers